Md. Golam Rabbani is a Bangladesh Awami League politician and the incumbent Member of Parliament from Chapai Nawabganj-1.

Early life
Rabbani was born on 1 April 1958. He has a B.A. degree.

Career
Rabbani was a leader of the Kansat Palli Bidyut protests in 2006.

Rabbani was elected to Parliament on 5 January 2014 from Chapai Nawabganj-1 as a Bangladesh Awami League candidate.

References

Awami League politicians
Living people
1958 births
10th Jatiya Sangsad members